Asterolibertia is a genus of fungi in the Asterinaceae family.

The genus name of Asterolibertia is in honour of Marie-Anne Libert (1782-1865), who was a Belgian botanist and mycologist. She was one of the first women plant pathologists.

Species

Known species; 
 Asterolibertia anisopterae 
 Asterolibertia bahiensis 
 Asterolibertia bakeri 
 Asterolibertia barrinhensis 
 Asterolibertia bredemeyerae 
 Asterolibertia burchelliae 
 Asterolibertia campograndensis 
 Asterolibertia couepiae 
 Asterolibertia crustacea 
 Asterolibertia cryptocaryae 
 Asterolibertia flabellariae 
 Asterolibertia gibbosa 
 Asterolibertia hiiranensis 
 Asterolibertia hydnocarpi 
 Asterolibertia inaequalis 
 Asterolibertia licaniae 
 Asterolibertia licaniicola 
 Asterolibertia malpighii 
 Asterolibertia mangiferae 
 Asterolibertia megathyria 
 Asterolibertia moquileae 
 Asterolibertia myocoproides 
 Asterolibertia nothopegiae 
 Asterolibertia parinaricola 
 Asterolibertia parinarii 
 Asterolibertia peruviana 
 Asterolibertia pogonophorae 
 Asterolibertia randiae 
 Asterolibertia santiriae 
 Asterolibertia schroeteri 
 Asterolibertia spatholobi 
 Asterolibertia sporoboli 
 Asterolibertia thaxteri 
 Asterolibertia ulei 
 Asterolibertia vateriae

References

External links
Index Fungorum

Asterinaceae